Ritiometan is an antibacterial used in nasal sprays. Also, it is used in an aerosol preparation for the treatment of infections of the nose and throat. It is marketed in France under the trade name Nécyrane.

References

Antimicrobials
Thioethers